Vasile Sturza (born 13 March 1953) is a Moldovan attorney and politician. He was the Ambassador Extraordinary and Plenipotentiary of the Republic of Moldova to the Russian Federation.

References 

Living people
Ambassadors of Moldova to Russia
1953 births
Recipients of the Order of Honour (Moldova)
Moldovan Ministers of Justice